Kraig Paulsen (born September 9, 1964) is an American attorney and politician who served as a member of the Iowa House of Representatives from 2003 to 2017 and as speaker of the Iowa House of Representatives from 2011 to 2015.

Early life and education 
Paulsen was born in Monticello, Iowa. His father, Dr. Kenneth Paulsen, is a veterinarian. His mother, Marilyn Felker, is a retired hospital transcription manager. Paulsen has one brother and two sisters. He graduated from John F. Kennedy High School. He earned a Bachelor of Business Administration from Iowa State University 1987, an MBA from Embry–Riddle Aeronautical University in 1994, and a Juris Doctor from the University of Iowa College of Law in 2003.

Career
Paulsen served United States Air Force, where he served as an operations group senior weapons instructor, maintenance flight commander, and squadron director of operations.

Paulsen was awarded the Meritorious Service Medal with one Oak Leaf Cluster, the USAF Commendation Medal, and the USAF Achievement Medal with one Oak Leaf Cluster. He was twice recognized as the Best Operations Crew in the USAF in his assigned weapon system, Air Force Space Command Maintenance Junior Officer Manager of the Year, and the Missile Wing Instructor of the Year.
Paulsen was first elected to the Iowa House in 2002 and serves House District 67, which includes: Hiawatha, Robins and portions of both Marion and Cedar Rapids. He served as speaker of the House from 2011 to 2015.

Paulsen was an attorney for CRST International, Inc. in Cedar Rapids.

In August 2015, Paulsen announced that he would step down as speaker of the House in January 2016 and would not seek re-election to the Iowa House in 2016. Paulsen then took an unadvertised position with Iowa State University in January 2016; leading a new supply chain initiative aimed at improving corporate engagement in research, experiential learning for students, and educational outreach for faculty and staff. The job Paulsen accepted was not advertised, as is required in most cases.

In 2019, Paulsen was appointed director of the Iowa Department of Revenue. In September 2021, he was appointed interim director of the Iowa Department of Management. Later, it was announced that Paulsen would continue in the role permanently and remain in the position as revenue director.

Personal life 
Paulsen married his high school sweetheart, Cathy, in Cedar Rapids in 1985. They have four children, a daughter and three sons. The Paulsen family is members of the New Covenant Bible Church in Cedar Rapids.

References

External links
 Representative Kraig Paulsen official Iowa General Assembly site
 
Profile at Iowa House Republicans
Kraig Paulsen State Representative official constituency site

|-

1964 births
Embry–Riddle Aeronautical University alumni
Republican Party members of the Iowa House of Representatives
Iowa State University alumni
Living people
People from Hiawatha, Iowa
People from Monticello, Iowa
Speakers of the Iowa House of Representatives
University of Iowa College of Law alumni
21st-century American politicians